is a Japanese spin-off light novel series of the Date A Live series written by Kōshi Tachibana. The series is written by Yuichiro Higashide under Kōshi Tachibana's supervision and illustrated by NOCO. A two-part anime film adaptation by Geek Toys was announced, with the first part Dead or Bullet premiering on August 14, 2020, and the second part Nightmare or Queen premiering on November 13, 2020.

Plot
Hibiki Higoromo, better known as Empty, is an amnesiac young girl. She wakes up in the neighboring world, where she encounters Kurumi Tokisaki. In order to kill the mysterious girl, Kurumi leads Empty to a school. When arriving at the school, a number of girls, known as quasi-spirits, gather together. Now, a new battle begins.

Characters

A clone of Kurumi Tokisaki that ended up in the Neighboring World after her death. She is known as  when her identity was stolen by Hibiki Higoromo.

The Dominion of the Third Region: Binah. She is also known as White Kurumi. It is revealed that her dominant personality is Kurumi's childhood friend, .

A mysterious person who approaches Kurumi.

A Quasi-Spirit who is infamous for being a veteran fighter who has killed 100 people with a single blow.

A Quasi-Spirit who was the Dominion of the Tenth Region: Malkuth.

A seventh type Quasi-Spirit.

A first type Quasi-Spirit.

Media

Light novels
Date A Live Fragment: Date A Bullet began serialization as a light novel on March 18, 2017 under Fujimi Shobo's Fujimi Fantasia Bunko. The series is written by Yuichiro Higashide and illustrated by NOCO, with Kōshi Tachibana as the supervisor. To date, eight volumes have been released in Japan.

Anime film
The anime project was first revealed on September 17, 2019. On September 23, 2019, an anime adaptation of the spin-off series was announced, later revealed to be a theatrical film. On May 18, 2020 it was announced that the series will be a prequel to the novels, and the title of the series is confirmed as Dead or Bullet. It is animated by Geek Toys and directed by Jun Nakagawa, with Yuichiro Higashide writing the script, and Naoto Nakamura designing the characters.  It was revealed that the adaptation will be a two-part film series. The first film, Date A Bullet: Dead or Bullet, premiered on August 14, 2020, followed by the second film, Date A Bullet: Nightmare or Queen, which premiered on November 13, 2020. Funimation licensed the first film.

References

External links
  
 Date A Live at Fujimi Shobo 
 

 
2017 Japanese novels
2020 anime films
Anime and manga based on light novels
Fujimi Fantasia Bunko
Funimation
Geek Toys